The 2004 Nordic Figure Skating Championships were held from February 13th through 15th, 2004 at the Olympiarinken in Helsingborg, Sweden. The competition was open to elite figure skaters from Nordic countries. Skaters competed in two disciplines, men's singles and ladies' singles, across two levels: senior (Olympic-level) and junior.

Senior results

Men

Ladies

Junior results

Men

Ladies

External links
 2004 Nordics

Nordic Figure Skating Championships, 2004
Nordic Figure Skating Championships
International figure skating competitions hosted by Sweden
Nordic Figure Skating Championships